The Driving License of the People's Republic of China is the legal driving license within China, excluding the two special administrative regions (Hong Kong and Macau). In these two territories, separate driving licenses must be obtained from their respective traffic authorities. It is issued, ratified, and regularly inspected by the traffic administrative department of the public security organ.  Minimum age varies from 18 (for cars) all the way up to 26 (for large buses) in the country.

Learner's licenses, although granted, have little effect, as most training takes place within the confines of specially-designed training areas inaccessible, on paper, to the general motoring public. Previously, expressways were inaccessible even for holders of a normal driver's license if they did not possess the license for a full year. However, such a regulation has now been invalidated. Drivers with licenses less than a year old, however, are still considered "intern drivers" or "new drivers", and certain limitations apply to them (examples: displaying a uniform label on the car when they are driving or having a person who has at least three years driving experience sit in the front passenger seat while driving on highways). The PRC considers the driving license, under a new law, an administrative license.

Some areas do not issue motorcycle licenses or three-wheeler licenses any more. This promotes driving without a license, fake licenses, or illegally-purchased licenses.

History
The first driver's license in the PRC was issued in 1949 to Mr. Guo from Shandong.

During the Maoist era, due to a person not being allowed to own a private car, obtaining a license was hard. Usually used only for work, a person had to be politically-checked before obtaining a license and the processing would last 2 to 3 years.

After China's economic reforms began, owning a private car was gradually allowed and the appearance of driver training schools in China began in the 1990s, and since then, the number of applicants for a license had steadily increased.

On April 10, 2019, the Ministry of Public Security  announced that applications for light motor vehicles (Type C1, C2, and C5) are no longer required to provide proof of residence in the issuing region if their hukou is not in the region. Before that, anyone whose hukou is not in the issuing region must have a "temporary living permit"（暂住证 or 居住证) of the region or other similar proof in order to take a test and get a license (of any Type). In October 2020, the Ministry of Public Security said that obtaining a motorcycle driver's license (Type D, E, and F) will not require a hukou starting on 20 November 2020. Some regions within China don't issue motorcycle licenses, effectively banning motorcycle driving.

Types of license

References

External links
 Motor Vehicle Driver's License Number Information Service Network

China
China, People's Republic of